Kamatchipuram  is a small village in Tamil Nadu, India and falls under village panchayat administrative unit of Chinnamanur block  in Uthamapalayam taluk, Theni district.

Geography
The nearby villages are Seepalakkottai, Veppampatti, Poomalaikkundu, Azhakapuri, Kallapatti, Erakkottaipatti.

Demography
There are many communities such as Nadar, Adi Dravida, Arundhathiyar, Chettiyar, Asari etc.

Educational institutions
 Pachaiyappa Hindu Nadar Primary School.
 Patchaiyappa Hindu Nadar Higher Secondary School.
 Mariyappa Memorial Matriculation School.
 Kamarajar Nursery & Primary School.

Economy

Its economy depends mostly on agriculture, business and trading. Once upon a time it was very famous for cotton trading.

Agriculture:
 As its lands are known for chilli cultivation most people from the nearby surrounding villages come purchase them in bulk  during harvest season.
 Onion and other food crops are cultivated.
 Banana plantation is one of the major plantations in this village.
 Tobacco cultivation.

Business:
Its business depends on near by villages, Compared to other nearby villages it has a good infrastructure and hospitality.

References

Villages in Theni district